Rousseaceae is a plant family in the order Asterales containing trees and shrubs. The fruit is a berry or capsule. Leaves are simple, with toothed margins. Leaf stipules are not seen in this group.

The family contains four genera and twelve or thirteen species. From Mauritius, Australia, New Guinea, New Zealand and a few other Pacific Islands. The genera Abrophyllum, Cuttsia and Carpodetus have been formerly placed in a separate family, Carpodetaceae, or within Escalloniaceae.

Taxonomy 
Roussea is sister to the remainder of the family and is most distanced from the other genera. Carpodetus is the sister to the clade consisting of Abrophyllum and Cuttsia. This results in the following phylogenetic tree.

References

 
Asterales families